Leukocyte-associated immunoglobulin-like receptor 2 is a protein that in humans is encoded by the LAIR2 gene.

The protein encoded by this gene is a member of the immunoglobulin superfamily. It was identified by its similarity to LAIR1, an inhibitory receptor present on mononuclear leukocytes. This gene maps to a region of 19q13.4, termed the leukocyte receptor cluster, which contains 29 genes in the immunoglobulin superfamily, including LAIR1. The function of this protein is unknown, although it is thought to be secreted and may help modulate mucosal tolerance. Two transcript variants encoding different isoforms have been found for this gene.

References

Further reading